Richard Rampton KC (born 8 January 1941) is a British libel lawyer. He has been involved in several high-profile cases including Irving v. Penguin Books and Lipstadt, where he defended Deborah Lipstadt and Penguin Books against David Irving.

Early life and education
Rampton was born on 8 January 1941, the eldest son of businessman and philanthropist Tony Rampton and his wife Joan. He was educated at Bryanston School and The Queen's College, Oxford.

Career
Richard Rampton was called to the Bar in November 1965 (Inner Temple) and was appointed a QC (Queen's Counsel) in 1987.

In Irving v. Penguin Books and Lipstadt, he represented Deborah Lipstadt and her publisher against false accusations of libel after she said that Irving was a Holocaust denier in her book Denying the Holocaust (1993). He also represented McDonald's in the McLibel case, where the company sued two members of the London Greenpeace environmental campaigning group.

Rampton's earlier cases include Andrew Neil (editor of The Sunday Times) vs Peregrine Worsthorne, Lord Aldington vs Count Nikolai Tolstoy and Gillian Taylforth vs News of the World. He also successfully represented politician George Galloway against The Daily Telegraph over allegations that he took £375,000 from Saddam Hussein's Iraqi regime. He represented Associated Newspapers Group plc in Lucas-Box v News Group Newspapers Ltd; Lucas-Box v Associated Newspapers Group plc and others. This case produced the "Lucas-Box meaning" whereby under modern libel practice a defendant must set out in his/her statement of case the defamatory meaning that he/she seeks to prove to be essentially or substantially true.

References

External links
 Holocaust denial on trial

1941 births
Living people
Alumni of The Queen's College, Oxford
English barristers
English King's Counsel
Members of the Middle Temple
People educated at Bryanston School
20th-century King's Counsel
21st-century King's Counsel